The Mae Long Formation in the Li Basin (also referred to as Li Mae Long) is a fossil site in Lamphun Province, Thailand. The fossils found are thought to date to the late Early Miocene, about 18 million years ago, corresponding to the European zone MN 4.

Fossil content 
Mammals found at the site include:
Metatherians
 Siamoperadectes minutus
Lipotyphlans
 Hylomys engesseri
 Neotetracus butleri
 Thaiagymnura equilateralis
 Unidentified Erinaceidae, possibly Mioechinus
 Scapanulus lampounensis
Bats
 Unidentified species possibly belonging to Taphozous
 Unidentified species of Megaderma
 Hipposideros felix
 H. khengkao
 Rhinolophus yongyuthsi
 Unidentified species of Rhinolophoidea
 Ia lanna
 Rhizomops mengraii
 Unidentified species of Vespertilionidae
Treeshrews
 Tupaia miocenica
Primates
 ?Nycticebus linglom
 Tarsius thailandica
Rodents
 Ratufa maelongensis
 Unidentified species possibly belonging to Atlantoxerus
 Democricetodon kaonou
 Diatomys liensis
 Neocometes orientalis
 Potwarmus thailandicus
 Prokanisamys benjavuni
 Spanocricetodon janvieri
Carnivorans
 Two unidentified species
Proboscideans
 Unidentified species
Perissodactyls
 Unidentified species
Artiodactyls
 Conohyus sindiensis
 Siamotragulus haripounchai
 Stephanocemas rucha
 Unidentified species possibly belonging to Homoiodorcas

References

Bibliography 
 Mein, P. and Ginsburg, L. 1997. Les mammifères du gisement miocène inférieur de Li Mae Long, Thaïlande : systématique, biostratigraphie et paléoenvironnement. Geodiversitas 19(4):783–844 (in French). Abstract in French and English

Geologic formations of Thailand
Neogene System of Asia
Cenozoic paleontological sites of Asia
Paleontology in Thailand
Geography of Lamphun province